Panayamparambil Sreenivasan a.k.a. P. S. Nivas(27 May 1946– 1 February 2021) was an Indian cinematographer, film director and film producer who worked in Malayalam, Tamil, Telugu, and Hindi cinema. He was a recipient of National Film Award for Best Cinematography for the 1976 Malayalam film Mohiniyaattam. He was a frequent collaborator with Bharathiraja and they worked together in 8 films.

Life
Born in Panayam parambil, East Nadakkavu, Calicut, Nivas graduated from the St. Joseph's College, Devagiri and went on to do a diploma in motion picture photography from the Institute of Film Technology, Adyar, Madras.

Career
Nivas started his film career as an operative camera man in P. N. Menon's Malayalam film, Kuttyedathi (1971). He apprenticed under Ashok Kumar in films such as Mappusakshi (1972), Chembarathi (1972) and Babu Nanthankode's Dhakam (1972) Swapnam (1973). His first film as an independent cinematographer was Sathyathinte Nizhalil, directed by Nanthankode. Nivas was awarded the National Film Award for Best Cinematography (Black and White) for the 1976 Malayalam film Mohiniyaattam.

Nivas made his Tamil cinema debut with Bharathiraja's 16 Vayathinile (1977). He went on to work with the director in films such as Kizhake Pogum Rail (1978), Sigappu Rojakkal (1978), Solva Sawan (1978) and Puthiya Vaarpugal (1979). He also photographed C. V. Sridhar's Ilamai Oonjal Aadukirathu and its Telugu remake, Vayasu Pilichindi (1978). In 1978, he won the Nandi Award for Best Cinematographer the Telugu film, Nimajjanam. He also worked with K. Viswanath in Saagara Sangamam (1983).

Nivas died on 1 February 2021, in Calicut.

Filmography

As cinematographer

Malayalam
 Sathyathinte Nizhalil
 Sindooram 
 Madhuram Thirumadhuram
 Mohiniyaattam
 Sankhupushpam
 Rajaparambara
 Sooryakanthi
 Pallavi
 Rajan Paranja Kadha
 Padmatheertham
 Velluvili
 Lisa (1978)
 Sarppam
 Maanyamahaajanangale
 Veendum Lisa
 Ayushman Bhava

Tamil
 16 Vayathinile (1977)
 Kizhake Pogum Rail (1978)
 Sigappu Rojakkal (1978)
 Ilamai Oonjal Aadukirathu (1978)
 Puthiya Vaarpugal (1979)
 Niram Maaratha Pookkal (1979)
 Kallukkul Eeram (1980)
 Enakkaga Kaathiru (1981)
 Nizhal Thedum Nenjangal (1981)
 Kozhi Koovuthu (1982 film) (1982)
 Thanikattu Raja (1982)
 Kokkarakko (1983)
 My Dear Lisa (1987)
 Sembakame Sembakame (1988)
 Enga Ooru Mappillai (1989)
 Ooru Vittu Ooru Vanthu (1990)
 Pass Mark (1994)
 Sevvanthi (1994)
 En Paadal Unakkaga

Telugu
 Vayasu Pilichindi
 Nimajjanam
 Punadi Rallu
 Saagara Sangamam
 Sankeerthana
 Hanthakudi Veta (1987)
 Nani

Hindi
 Solva Saawan
 Red Rose
 Bhayaanak Mahal (1988)

As director
 Kallukkul Eeram (1980)
 Enakkaga Kaathiru (1981)
 Nizhal Thedum Nenjangal (1982)
 Sevvanthi (1994)

References

External links
 

1946 births
2021 deaths
20th-century Indian film directors
20th-century Indian photographers
Artists from Kozhikode
Best Cinematography National Film Award winners
Businesspeople from Kozhikode
Cinematographers from Kerala
Film directors from Kerala
Film producers from Kerala
Kerala State Film Award winners
Malayalam film cinematographers
M.G.R. Government Film and Television Training Institute alumni
Nandi Award winners
Tamil film cinematographers
Tamil film directors
Telugu film cinematographers